The English military existed while England was an independent state and at war with other states. However, it was not until the 16th century that standing armed forces were established: the Royal Navy and the English Army. The commander-in-chief of His/Her Majesty's Armed Forces was the English monarch. Under English constitutional law, the armed forces were subordinate to the Crown. However under the 1689 Bill of Rights no standing army was to be maintained during time of peace without the consent of Parliament.

See also
 Anglo-Saxon warfare